Patrick Murray (born June 22, 1991) is a former American football placekicker. He played college football at Fordham.

College career
Murray was raised in Mahwah, New Jersey. After playing football for Don Bosco Preparatory High School, Murray considered attending college in Dublin, but decided to play for Fordham, with whom he served as both punter and kicker. He appeared in 44 games in his four-year career (2009–2012) at Fordham, finishing with 186 punts for 7,985 yards and 38 made field goals on 54 attempts. As a senior, he was named a consensus first-team All-American kicker after connecting on 25–30 (83.3%) field goals, while punting 52 times for 2,392 yards.

Professional career

Tampa Bay Buccaneers
On December 31, 2013, the Tampa Bay Buccaneers signed Murray to a futures contract after the Buccaneers lost their last game of the 2013 season to the New Orleans Saints. He beat out veteran Connor Barth, who was released from the team August 29, 2014, when they made final roster cuts. Murray and Barth were both released September 4, 2015, from the Tampa Bay roster in favor of rookie kicker Kyle Brindza.
 On September 5, 2015, he was placed on injured reserve. On May 19, 2016, he was waived by the Buccaneers.

Cleveland Browns
On June 9, 2016, Murray signed with the Cleveland Browns. On September 11, 2016, Murray connected on his first field goal as a member of the Browns, a 35-yarder. On September 24, 2016, he was placed on injured reserve with a knee injury. He was released by the Browns on December 23, 2016.

New Orleans Saints
On August 6, 2017, Murray signed with the New Orleans Saints. He was waived on August 12, 2017.

Tampa Bay Buccaneers (second stint)
On October 9, 2017, Murray signed with the Buccaneers after Nick Folk missed three field goals the previous week.

Personal life
Murray's family had a Gaelic football heritage, with his father Aidan and uncle Ciaran having both played for Monaghan GAA.

References

External links

 Fordham Rams football biography
 Tampa Bay Buccaneers biography

1991 births
Living people
Don Bosco Preparatory High School alumni
People from Mahwah, New Jersey
Players of American football from New Jersey
Fordham Rams football players
Tampa Bay Buccaneers players
Cleveland Browns players
New Orleans Saints players